Charles Stanley Nott (1887–1978) was an author, publisher, translator and a student of G. I. Gurdjieff. He first met Gurdjieff and A. R. Orage in New York in 1923. He spent time at the Institute for the Harmonious Development of Man and became a close student of Gurdjieff. He helped with the publication and distribution of Gurdjieff's first published book The Herald of Coming Good. He wrote two books on his life and experience with Gurdjieff, Orage, and P. D. Ouspensky.

Early life

Nott was born in Bedfordshire, England, and grew up in a Hertfordshire village.

Publishing

Nott had a publishing business in London until the outbreak of World War II. He helped A. R. Orage  to start The New English Weekly in 1932.

Bibliography
The Young Churchill - A Biography, Stanley Nott, 1941, Coward-McCann, Inc. Publishers, New York
Teachings of Gurdjieff - A Pupil's Journal, C. S. Nott, 1961, Published by Penguin Arkana, 1990, 
Further Teachings of Gurdjieff - Journey Through This World - Including Account of Meetings with G I Gurdjieff, A R Orage and P D Ouspensky, C. S. Nott, Routledge & Kegan Paul, 1969,  (cloth),  (paper)
The Conference of the Birds - Mantiq Ut-Tair, Farid Ud-Din Attar, English Translation by C. S. Nott, First published 1954 by The Janus Press, London, Reissued by Routledge and Kegan Paul Ltd, 1961,

References

1887 births
1978 deaths
20th-century mystics
Fourth Way
American translators
20th-century translators

Students of George Gurdjieff